Jhimpir is a village in Thatta District, Sindh, Pakistan. It is situated 114 km away from Karachi. It is the site of Pakistan's first wind power project.
However, Jhimpir has a railway station and train service is available for Karachi and upcountry from here.

The Jhimpir Wind Power Plant is a wind farm located at Jhimpir in Thatta District of Sindh province in Pakistan, 120 kilometres North-East of Karachi. The project has been developed by Zorlu Energy Pakistan, a subsidiary of the Turkish firm Zorlu Enerji. The total cost of project is $143 million. The energy production is 55 MW

References

Populated places in Thatta District